"Shirl Girl" is a song written by Rudy Clark and Bobby Darin and performed by Wayne Newton.  The song was arranged by Bert Keyes.

Chart performance
"Shirl Girl" reached #18 on the U.S. adult contemporary chart and #58 on the Billboard Hot 100 in 1963.

Other versions
Mike Clifford released a version as the B-side to his 1965 single "Before I Loved Her".

References

1963 songs
1963 singles
Songs written by Rudy Clark
Songs written by Bobby Darin
Wayne Newton songs
Capitol Records singles